William Postlethwaite  (17 September 1829 – 9 April 1908) was an English-born Member of Parliament representing the Canterbury region of New Zealand.

Postlethwaite was born in Broughton, Lancashire, the son of Robert and Agnes Postlethwaite. He was tutored by Branwell Brontë, brother to the Brontë sisters. He married Annie Camilla Brisco, daughter of Sir Robert Brisco, 3rd Baronet, in 1859. He succeeded to his uncle's Oaks estate in Millom, Cumberland, but in an unusual move for landed gentry, moved to New Zealand in 1878.

Postlethwaite represented the Geraldine electorate from 1881 to 1884, when he retired. He was an independent politician.

He then moved to California in 1891, living as a farmer in Lindsay, but returned to England, where he died in 1908.

References

1829 births
1908 deaths
Members of the New Zealand House of Representatives
New Zealand MPs for South Island electorates
19th-century New Zealand politicians
People from Broughton, Lancashire